Andrew Vanlalhruaia (born 13 January 1987) is an Indian cricketer. He made his first-class debut for Mizoram in the 2018–19 Ranji Trophy on 7 January 2019. He made his Twenty20 debut for Mizoram in the 2018–19 Syed Mushtaq Ali Trophy on 27 February 2019. He made his List A debut on 14 December 2021, for Mizoram in the 2021–22 Vijay Hazare Trophy.

References

External links
 

1987 births
Living people
Indian cricketers
Mizoram cricketers
Place of birth missing (living people)